The Rural Municipality of Silver Creek is a former rural municipality (RM) in the Canadian province of Manitoba. It was originally incorporated as a rural municipality on December 22, 1883. It ceased on January 1, 2015 as a result of its provincially mandated amalgamation with the RM of Shellmouth-Boulton to form the Rural Municipality of Riding Mountain West.

The former RM is located in the Parkland Region of the province. It borders the Waywayseecappo First Nation Indian reserve to the east. It had a population of 483 in the 2006 census.

Communities 
Angusville
Silverton

References

External links 
 
 Silver Creek, MB Community Profile
 Map of Silver Creek R.M. at Statcan

Silver Creek
Populated places disestablished in 2015
2015 disestablishments in Manitoba